Rodney Dangerfield (born Jacob Rodney Cohen; November 22, 1921 – October 5, 2004) was an American stand-up comedian, actor, screenwriter, and producer. He was known for his self-deprecating one-liner humor, his catchphrase "I don't get no respect!" and his monologues on that theme.

He began his career working as a stand-up comic at the Fantasy Lounge in New York City. His act grew in popularity as he became a mainstay on late-night talk shows throughout the 1960s and 1970s, eventually developing into a headlining act on the Las Vegas casino circuit. His catchphrase "I don't get no respect!" came from an attempt to improve one of his stand-up jokes. "I played hide and seek; they wouldn't even look for me." He thought the joke would be stronger if it used the format: "I was so ..." beginning ("I was so poor," "He was so ugly," "She was so stupid," etc.). He tried "I get no respect," and got a much better response from the audience; it became a permanent feature of his act and comedic persona.

He appeared in a few bit parts in films, such as The Projectionist, throughout the 1970s, but his breakout film role came in 1980 as a boorish nouveau riche golfer in the ensemble comedy Caddyshack, which was followed by two additional successful films in which he starred: 1983's Easy Money and 1986's Back to School. Additional film work kept him busy through the rest of his life, mostly in comedies, but with a rare dramatic role in 1994's Natural Born Killers as an abusive father. Health troubles curtailed his output through the early 2000s before his death in 2004, following a month in a coma due to complications from heart valve surgery.

Early life
Rodney Dangerfield was born Jacob Rodney Cohen in Deer Park, New York, on November 22, 1921. He was the son of Jewish parents Dorothy "Dotty" Teitelbaum and the vaudevillian performer Phillip Cohen, whose stage name was Phil Roy. His mother was born in the Austro-Hungarian Empire. Phillip Cohen was rarely home; his son normally saw him only twice a year. Late in life, Cohen begged for, and received, his son's forgiveness.

Dangerfield's mother was cruel and cold to him his entire life. Throughout his childhood she never kissed or hugged him or showed him any sign of affection. In an interview with Howard Stern on May 25, 2004, Dangerfield told Stern that he had been molested by a man in his neighborhood. The man would pay Rodney a nickel and kiss him for five minutes.

After Cohen's father abandoned the family, his mother moved him and his sister to Kew Gardens, Queens. There Dangerfield attended Richmond Hill High School, from which he graduated in 1939. To support himself and his family, he delivered groceries and sold newspapers and ice cream at the beach.

At the age of 15, he began to write for stand-up comedians while performing at the Nevele, a resort in Ellenville, New York. Then, at the age of 19 he legally changed his name to Jack Roy. He struggled financially for nine years, at one point performing as a singing waiter until he was fired, before taking a job selling aluminum siding in the mid-1950s to support his wife and family. He later quipped that he was so little known when he gave up show business that "at the time I quit, I was the only one who knew I quit."

Career

Early career
In the early 1960s, he started reviving his career as an entertainer. Still working as a salesman by day, he returned to the stage, performing at many hotels in the Catskill Mountains, but still finding minimal success. He fell into debt (about $20,000 by his own estimate), and couldn't get booked. As he later joked, "I played one club—it was so far out, my act was reviewed in Field & Stream."

He came to realize that what he lacked was an "image", a well-defined on-stage persona that audiences could relate to, one that would distinguish him from other comics. After being shunned by some premier comedy venues, he returned home where he began developing a character for whom nothing goes right.

He took the name Rodney Dangerfield, which had been used as the comical name of a faux cowboy star by Jack Benny on his radio program at least as early as December 21, 1941, broadcast, later as a pseudonym by Ricky Nelson on the TV program The Adventures of Ozzie and Harriet, and (coincidentally) a pseudonymous singer at Camp Records, which led to rumors that Jack Roy had been signed to Camp Records (something he bewilderedly denied shortly before his death). The Benny character, who also received little or no respect from the outside world, served as a great inspiration to Dangerfield while he was developing his own comedy character. The Biography TV program also tells of the time Benny visited Dangerfield backstage after one of his performances. During this visit, Benny complimented him on developing such a wonderful comedy character and style. However, Jack Roy remained Dangerfield's legal name, as he mentioned in several interviews. During a question-and-answer session with the audience on the album No Respect, Dangerfield joked that his real name was Percival Sweetwater.

Career surge

In March 1967, The Ed Sullivan Show needed a last-minute replacement for another act, and Dangerfield became the surprise hit of the show.

Dangerfield began headlining shows in Las Vegas and continued making frequent appearances on The Ed Sullivan Show. He also became a regular on The Dean Martin Show and appeared on The Tonight Show more than 70 times.

In 1969, Rodney Dangerfield teamed up with longtime friend Anthony Bevacqua to build the Dangerfield's comedy club in New York City, a venue where he could perform on a regular basis without having to constantly travel. The club remained in continuous operation until October 14, 2020. Dangerfield's was the venue for several HBO comedy specials starring such stand-up comics as Jerry Seinfeld, Jim Carrey, Tim Allen, Roseanne Barr, Robert Townsend, Jeff Foxworthy, Sam Kinison, Bill Hicks, Rita Rudner, Andrew Dice Clay, Louie Anderson, Dom Irrera, and Bob Saget.

In 1978, Dangerfield was invited to be the keynote speaker at Harvard University's Class Day, an annual ceremony for seniors the day before commencement.

 His 1980 comedy album No Respect won a Grammy Award. One of his TV specials featured a musical number, "Rappin' Rodney", which appeared on his 1983 follow-up album, Rappin' Rodney. In December 1983, the "Rappin' Rodney" single became one of the first Hot 100 rap records, and the associated video was an early MTV hit. The video featured cameo appearances by Don Novello as a last rites priest munching on Rodney's last meal of fast food in a styrofoam container and Pat Benatar as a masked executioner pulling a hangman's knot. The two appear in a dream sequence wherein Dangerfield is condemned to die and does not get any respect, even in Heaven, as the gates close without his being permitted to enter.

Career peak
Though his acting career had begun much earlier in obscure movies like The Projectionist (1971), Dangerfield's career took off during the early 1980s, when he began acting in hit comedy movies.

One of Dangerfield's more memorable performances was in the 1980 golf comedy Caddyshack, in which he played an obnoxious nouveau riche property developer who was a guest at a golf club, where he clashed with the uptight Judge Elihu Smails (played by Ted Knight). His role was initially smaller, but because he and fellow cast members Chevy Chase and Bill Murray proved adept at improvisation, their roles were greatly expanded during filming (much to the chagrin of some of their castmates). Initial reviews of Caddyshack praised Dangerfield's standout performance among the wild cast. His appearance in Caddyshack led to starring roles in Easy Money and Back to School, for which he also served as co-writer. Unlike his stand-up persona, his comedy film characters were portrayed as successful and generally popular—if still loud, brash, and detested by the wealthy elite.

Throughout the 1980s, Dangerfield also appeared in a series of commercials for Miller Lite beer, including one in which various celebrities who had appeared in the ads were holding a bowling match. With the score tied, after a bearded Ben Davidson told Rodney, "All we need is one pin, Rodney", Dangerfield's ball went down the lane and bounced perpendicularly off the head pin, landing in the gutter without knocking down any of the pins. He also appeared in the endings of Billy Joel's music video of "Tell Her About It" and Lionel Richie's video of "Dancing on the Ceiling".

In 1990, Dangerfield was involved in an unsold TV pilot for NBC called Where's Rodney? The show starred Jared Rushton as a teenager, also named Rodney, who could summon Dangerfield whenever he needed guidance about his life.

In a change of pace from the comedy persona that made him famous, he played an abusive father in Natural Born Killers in a scene for which he wrote or rewrote all of his own lines.

Dangerfield was rejected for membership in the Motion Picture Academy in 1995 by the head of the academy's Actors Section, Roddy McDowall. After fan protests, the academy reconsidered, but Dangerfield then refused to accept membership.

In March 1995, Dangerfield was the first celebrity to personally own a website and create content for it. He interacted with fans who visited his site via an "E-mail me" link, often surprising people with a reply. By 1996, Dangerfield's website proved to be such a hit that he made Websight magazine's list of the "100 Most Influential People on the Web".

Dangerfield appeared in an episode of The Simpsons titled "Burns, Baby Burns" in which he played a character who is essentially a parody of his own persona, Mr. Burns's son Larry Burns. He also appeared as himself in an episode of Home Improvement.

Dangerfield also appeared in the 2000 Adam Sandler film Little Nicky, playing Lucifer, the father of Satan (Harvey Keitel) and grandfather of Nicky (Sandler).

He was recognized by the Smithsonian Institution, which put one of his trademark white shirts and red ties on display. When he handed the shirt to the museum's curator, Rodney joked, "I have a feeling you're going to use this to clean Lindbergh's plane."

Dangerfield played an important role in comedian Jim Carrey's rise to stardom. In the 1980s, after watching Carrey perform at the Comedy Store in Los Angeles, Rodney signed Carrey to open for Dangerfield's Las Vegas show. The two toured together for about two more years. When Dangerfield celebrated his 80th birthday on The Tonight Show with Jay Leno in November 2001, Carrey made a surprise appearance to thank Dangerfield for his years of support.

Personal life
Dangerfield was married twice to Joyce Indig. They married in 1951, divorced in 1961, remarried in 1963, and divorced again in 1970, although Rodney lived largely separated from his family. Together, the couple had two children: son Brian Roy (born 1960) and daughter Melanie Roy-Friedman, born after her parents remarried. From 1993 until his death, Dangerfield was married to Joan Child, whom he met on Santa Monica beach, where she ran a flower shop.

At the time of a People magazine article on Dangerfield in 1980, he was sharing an apartment on Manhattan's Upper East Side with a housekeeper, his poodle Keno, and his closest friend of 30 years, Joe Ancis whom Dangerfield called "the funniest man in the world", Ancis was also a friend of and major influence on Lenny Bruce. Ancis, who Roseanne Barr described as "too psychologically damaged to be able to live in a germ-infested world on his own", lived with Dangerfield until Ancis's death in 2001.

Dangerfield resented being confused with his on-stage persona. Although his wife Joan described him as "classy, gentlemanly, sensitive and intelligent," he was often treated like the loser he played and documented this in his 2004 autobiography, It's Not Easy Bein' Me: A Lifetime of No Respect but Plenty of Sex and Drugs. In this work, he also discussed being a marijuana smoker; the book's original title was My Love Affair with Marijuana.

Although Jewish, Dangerfield referred to himself as an atheist during an interview with Howard Stern on May 25, 2004. Dangerfield added that he was a "logical" atheist, adding, "We're apes––do apes go anyplace?"

Later years and death

On November 22, 2001 (his 80th birthday), Dangerfield suffered a mild heart attack while doing stand-up on The Tonight Show. While Dangerfield was performing, host Jay Leno noticed something was wrong with Dangerfield's movements and asked his producer to call the paramedics. During Dangerfield's hospital stay, the staff were reportedly upset that he smoked marijuana in his room. Dangerfield returned to the Tonight Show a year later, performing on his 81st birthday.

On April 8, 2003, Dangerfield underwent brain surgery to improve blood flow in preparation for heart valve-replacement surgery on a later date. The heart surgery took place on August 24, 2004. Upon entering the University of California, Los Angeles Medical Center, he uttered another characteristic one-liner when asked how long he would be hospitalized: "If all goes well, about a week. If not, about an hour and a half." He would never wake up from the anesthesia he was put under, and he would ultimately die there from complications of the surgery just six weeks later, on October 5, 2004, at age 82.

Dangerfield was interred in the Westwood Village Memorial Park Cemetery in Los Angeles. On the day of Dangerfield's death, the randomly selected Joke of the Day on his website happened to be "I tell ya I get no respect from anyone. I bought a cemetery plot. The guy said, 'There goes the neighborhood!'" This led his wife, Joan Dangerfield, to choose "There goes the neighborhood" as the epitaph on his headstone, which has become so well known that it has been used as a New York Times crossword puzzle clue.

Dangerfield's widow held an event in which the word "respect" had been emblazoned in the sky, while each guest was given a live monarch butterfly for a butterfly-release ceremony led by Farrah Fawcett.

Legacy
UCLA's Division of Neurosurgery named a suite of operating rooms after him and gave him the "Rodney Respect Award", which his widow presented to Jay Leno on October 20, 2005. It was presented on behalf of the David Geffen School of Medicine/Division of Neurosurgery at UCLA at their 2005 Visionary Ball. Other recipients of the "Rodney Respect Award" include Tim Allen (2007), Jim Carrey (2009), Louie Anderson (2010), Bob Saget (2011), Chelsea Handler (2012), Chuck Lorre (2013), Kelsey Grammer (2014), Brad Garrett (2015), Jon Lovitz (2016), and Jamie Masada (2019).

In memoriam, Saturday Night Live ran a short sketch of Dangerfield (played by Darrell Hammond) at the gates of heaven. Saint Peter mentions that he heard Dangerfield got no respect in life, which prompts Dangerfield to spew an entire string of his famous one-liners. After he's done, he asks why Saint Peter was so interested. Saint Peter replies, "I just wanted to hear those jokes one more time" and waves him into heaven, prompting Dangerfield to joyfully declare: "Finally! A little respect!"
On September 10, 2006, Comedy Central's Legends: Rodney Dangerfield commemorated his life and legacy. Featured comedians included Adam Sandler, Chris Rock, Jay Leno, Ray Romano, Roseanne Barr, Jerry Seinfeld, Bob Saget, Jerry Stiller, Kevin Kline and Jeff Foxworthy.

In 2007, a Rodney Dangerfield tattoo was among the most popular celebrity tattoos in the United States.

On The Tonight Show with Jay Leno, May 29, 2009, Leno credited Dangerfield with popularizing the style of joke he had long been using. The format of the joke is that the comedian tells a sidekick how bad something is, and the sidekick—in this case, guitar player Kevin Eubanks—sets up the joke by asking just how bad that something is.

The official Rodney Dangerfield website was nominated for a Webby Award after it was relaunched by his widow, Joan Dangerfield, on what would have been his 92nd birthday, November 22, 2013. Since then, Dangerfield has been honored with two additional Webby Award nominations and one win.

In 2014, Dangerfield was awarded an honorary doctorate posthumously from Manhattanville College, officially deeming him Dr. Dangerfield.

Beginning on June 12, 2017, Los Angeles City College Theatre Academy hosted the first class of The Rodney Dangerfield Institute of Comedy. The class is a stand-up comedy class which is taught by comedienne Joanie Willgues, aka Joanie Coyote.

In August 2017, a plaque honoring Dangerfield was installed in Kew Gardens, his old Queens neighborhood.

In 2019, an inscription was made to the "Wall of Life" at Hebrew University's Mt. Scopus Campus that reads "Joan and Rodney Dangerfield."

Filmography

Film

Television

Discography

Albums

Compilation albums

Bibliography
 I Couldn't Stand My Wife's Cooking, So I Opened a Restaurant (Jonathan David Publishers, 1972) 
 I Don't Get No Respect (PSS Adult, 1973) 
 No Respect (Perennial, 1995) 
 It's Not Easy Bein' Me: A Lifetime of No Respect but Plenty of Sex and Drugs (HarperEntertainment, 2004)

Awards and nominations

References

External links

 
 
 
 Interview about how Jack Roy became Rodney Dangerfield
 Article about Dangerfield from a Kew Gardens website
 Audio interview (7/6/04) with Fresh Airs Terry Gross
 Episode capsule for Simpsons episode #4F05 "Burns, Baby Burns"

1921 births
2004 deaths
20th-century American comedians
20th-century American male actors
21st-century American male actors
20th-century atheists
21st-century atheists
American male film actors
American people of Hungarian-Jewish descent
American male television actors
American male voice actors
American stand-up comedians
Bell Records artists
Burials at Westwood Village Memorial Park Cemetery
Grammy Award winners
Jewish American atheists
Jewish American male actors
People from Deer Park, New York
Jewish American screenwriters
Jewish American male comedians
Screenwriters from New York (state)
21st-century American comedians
People from Kew Gardens, Queens
20th-century American screenwriters
Deaths from complications of heart surgery